Purshotam Lal (born 1954) is an Indian cardiologist and chairman and director of Interventional Cardiology of the Metro Group of Hospitals. He has been awarded the Padma Vibhushan (2009), Padma Bhushan (2003),Dr. B. C. Roy Award (2004), and Honorary Degree of Doctor of Science (Medicine) (2022), He specializes in non-surgical closure of heart holes (ASD/VSD), non-surgical replacement of valves, and treatment of multiple sclerosis.

Accomplishments
Lal pioneered interventional cardiology, and introduced the largest number of interventional techniques (as an
alternative to open heart surgery) in the country. Lal performed the largest number of angioplasties/stentings procedures in the country. After spending 15 years in the United States,  Lal returned to India.

Lal has taught interventional cardiology for 20 years.

Achievements

 Was the first doctor in India to use rotational angioplasty, diamond drilling, and stenting.

Memberships
He has been associated with:
 Fellow, American College of Cardiology
 Fellow, American College of Medicine
 Fellow, Royal College of Physicians (Canada)
 Fellow, Society of Cardiac Angiography and Interventions, USA
 Fellow, Indian College of Cardiology
 Member, British Cardiovascular Interventional Society
 Member, German Society of Cardiovascular Research
 Member, Central Council of Health & Family Welfare – an apex advisory body of the Ministry of Health & Family Welfare, Govt. of India
 Member, Expert Committee for medical devices, Ministry of Health & Family Welfare, Govt. of India
 Member, Delhi Medical Council

Awards and honours

National
Padma Vibhushan (2009)
Dr. B. C. Roy Award (2004) - for innovations in interventional cardiology
Padma Bhushan (2003)
Father of Interventional Cardiologist in India (2022)
Doctor of Science (Medicine) (by Shri Kalraj Mishra, Governor of Rajasthan at the convocation ceremony of Rajasthan University of Health Sciences, Jaipur, 20 May 2022)

Sant Nirankari Mission
Dr. P. Lal has been closely associated with Sant Nirankari Mission. He gave credit for his success to teachings of mission and blessings of Satguru. Currently he is serving in managing committee of Sant Nirankari Charitable Foundation (SNCF).

References

Living people
Indian cardiologists
Recipients of the Padma Vibhushan in medicine
Medical doctors from Punjab, India
1954 births
Recipients of the Padma Bhushan in medicine
Dr. B. C. Roy Award winners
20th-century Indian medical doctors
Fellows of the American College of Cardiology